Goulburn River, a perennial river of the Hunter River catchment, is located in the Upper Hunter region of New South Wales, Australia.

Course and features
Goulburn River rises at the confluence of Moolarben Creek and Sportsmans Hollow Creek, on the eastern slopes of the Great Dividing Range, near the village of Ulan, east of Mudgee and flows generally eastward, joined by twenty-one tributaries including the Munmurra, Krui, Bylong, Bow, and Merriwa rivers and Worondi Rivulet. The majority of the course of the river flows through the Goulburn River National Park. The river descends  over its  course.

Etymology
William Lawson explored the area in 1823. Goulburn River was named in honour of Henry Goulburn, a British politician in the 1820s.

See also

 Rivers of New South Wales
 List of rivers of New South Wales (A–K)
 List of rivers of Australia
 Goulburn River National Park

References

External links
 

 

Rivers of the Hunter Region
Muswellbrook Shire
Hunter River (New South Wales)